Umberto Borsò (3 April 1923, La Spezia – 26 November 2018, Rome) was an Italian operatic tenor.

References

1923 births
2018 deaths
People from La Spezia
Italian operatic tenors
20th-century Italian  male opera singers